Karang Bolong Beach may refer to:
Karang Bolong Beach (Nusa Kambangan), a beach in Nusa Kambangan, Cilacap, Central Java
Karang Bolong Beach (Anyer), a beach in Anyer, West Java